This is an incomplete list of awards and nominations received by Taiwanese Mandopop alternative rock band Mayday.

Golden Melody Awards
The Golden Melody Awards are presented annually by the Government Information Office of the Republic of China (Taiwan) and is Taiwan's equivalent to the Grammy Awards.

HITO Radio Music Awards
The HITO Radio Music Awards are given annually by HITO Radio, the parent company of Taiwanese radio station Hit FM. The order is not specified for the Top 10 Songs of the Year.

Metro Radio Hit Awards
The Metro Radio Hit Awards, like the Metro Radio Mandarin Music Awards, are given annually (usually in December) by Hong Kong radio station Metro Info. In contrast to the Mandarin Music Awards, the Hit Awards focuses on Cantopop music, and provide a few honours for Mandarin-language music.

1999
Taiwan Association of Music Workers - Top 10 Singles of The Year for 'Peter and Mary'《志明與春嬌》
Hit FM Taipei Music Net - Best Single of The Year for 'Peter and Mary'
China Times  - Best Newcomer Band of The Year Award
Channel [V] - Newcomer Band With Most Potential Award
GTV and San Li Channel - Voted Most Popular Band

2000
Hit FM Awards - Best Band of The Year
Hit FM Awards - Best Single of The Year for 'Tenderness'《溫柔》
 Min Sheng Newspaper - Voted Top 10 Artistes

2001
Singapore Golden Awards - Best Band
Channel [V] - Best Band
Global Chinese Music Awards - Best Band
Singapore FM 93.3 - Top 10 Albums of the Year
Taiwan Association of Music Workers - Top Ten Albums of the Year for 'Viva Love'
Taiwan Association of Music Workers - Top Ten Singles of the Year for 'Tenderness'
好樂迪 Most Picked KTV Song for 'Peter and Mary'
7th Chinese Music Awards - Most Popular Song for 'Loneliness Terminator'《終結孤單》

2002
G-Music Taiwan Albums Ranking - Best selling Band of the Year
Channel [V] - Most Popular Band

2003
9th Chinese Music Awards - Most Popular Band
TVB8 Channel - Best Band

2004
Singapore Golden Awards - Best Band
10th Chinese Music Awards - Best Band
2004 MusicRadio Top - Best Band 、Most Popular Band Among Youth
5th Global Chinese Music Awards - Best Band
5th Global Chinese Music Awards - Top 25 Songs for 'Stubbornness' 《倔強》
MusicRadio Top - Song of the Year for 'Stubbornness'
Taiwan Association of Music Workers - Top Ten Albums of the Year
Taiwan Association of Music Workers - Top Ten Songs of the Year for 'Stubbornness'

2005
Singapore Golden Awards - Best Band, Best Album, Best Composer

2006
6th Global Chinese Music Awards - Best Band

2009
Singapore Golden Awards - Best Band, Best Album, Most Popular Group(最受歡迎團體),Asia Media (Band) [亞洲傳媒大獎（樂團）]

References

Awards
Lists of awards received by Taiwanese musician
Lists of awards received by musical group